P. nana may refer to:
 Parapsectra nana, a midge species in the genus Parapsectra
 Platanavis nana, a kuzholiid bird species in the genus Platanavis found in the Bissekty Formation in Uzbekistan
 Portea nana, a plant species endemic to Brazil
 Protea nana, a flowering plant species in the genus Protea
 Ptychadena nana, a frog species endemic to Ethiopia
 Puya nana, a plant species endemic to Bolivia

Synonyms
 Phalaena nana, a synonym for Hadena confusa, the marbled coronet, a moth species

See also
 Nana (disambiguation)